Wonpil Im, Ph.D., is professor of Biological Sciences and Bioengineering at the Lehigh University and has been named the Presidential Endowed Chair in Health Science and Engineering. He has previously taught at University of Kansas. Wonpil Im has been appointed to KIAS scholar in 2016. Wonpil Im was a recipient of the 2017 Friedrich Wilhelm Bessel Research Award in Bioinformatics and Theoretical Biology, awarded by the Alexander von Humboldt Foundation.

Career
Im obtained B.Sc. and M.Sc. in chemistry from the Hanyang University in 1994 and 1996, respectively. In 1997, he moved to Montreal, Canada and started his Ph.D. studies in chemistry at University of Montreal under the guidance of professor Benoît Roux. He received his Ph.D. in 2002 from Cornell University.

Research
His laboratory at the Lehigh University mostly uses theoretical/computational methods, such as classical molecular dynamics, to chemical and physical problems in biology and material science.

Awards and fellowships
Friedrich Wilhelm Bessel Research Award, Alexander von Humboldt Foundation (2016)
Korea Institute for Advanced Study scholar (2017)

References

External links

Wonpil Im Research Group at the Lehigh University

Living people
American biochemists
Cornell University alumni
Lehigh University faculty
South Korean emigrants to the United States
20th-century births
South Korean biochemists
University of Kansas faculty
Year of birth missing (living people)